Fernando García may refer to:

 Fernando García de Hita (fl. 1097–1125), medieval Castilian nobleman
 Fernando García Roel (1921–2009), Mexican chemical engineer
 Fernando Luis García (1929–1952), United States Marine and Medal of Honor recipient
 Fernando García (composer) (born 1930), Chilean composer
 Fernando Gabriel García (born 1981), Argentine handball goalkeeper
 Fernando García (footballer) (born 1987), Peruvian footballer
 Fernando García (fencer), Spanish Olympic fencer
 Fernando García (sailor) (born 1952), Argentine Olympic sailor
 Fernando García (sportsperson) (born 1935), Filipino judoka and wrestler
 Fernando Fernández García (born 1954), Mexican politician
 Fernando Soto-Hay y García, member of the National Court of Honor of the Asociación de Scouts de México
 Fernando Garcia (speedway rider) (born 1994), Argentine speedway rider
 Fernando Garcia (soccer, born 1999), American soccer player